"Who Do You Think You Are?" is a song written and recorded by New Zealand-born, Australian pop singer Collette. It was released in August 1990 as the lead single from her second studio album, Attitude (1991). The song peaked at number 56 on the Australian ARIA singles chart.

Formats and track listings
7" (CBS 656128) 
Side A "Who Do You Think You Are" - 3:48
Side B "Victim of the Groove" (Aja Remix) - 3:58

12"
Side A1 "Who Do You Think You Are" (Club Mix) - 6:24
Side A2 "Who Do You Think You Beat" - 2:42
Side B1 "Who Do You Think You Are" (Dub) - 5:15
Side B2 "Who Do You Think You Are" (Percappella) - 4:06

Charts

References

1990 songs
1990 singles
CBS Records singles
Songs written by Collette Roberts